House of Councillors elections were held in Japan in 1977. Only half of the House of Councillors was up for election.

The main question of this election was whether or not the Liberal Democratic Party (LDP) would be able to retain its hold on an absolute majority of the seats in the House of Councillors, something it has maintained since the party's founding in 1955. Early forecasts had speculated that this dramatic downturn for the LDP may have been possible, but in the end the LDP kept its razor-thin hold on majority control by having four LDP-allied independents cooperate with it. As per usual for the time, the LDP did very well in the sparsely-populated single member districts and even managed to hold its own not only in the two-member districts, but even in the more heavily urbanised three- and four-member districts which were projected to be tough wins for the LDP.

The LDP's clearest struggling was in the national district, where its popular vote declined by 8.5% when compared to the previous House of Councillors election. In any event, the pessimistic forecasts of the election results ended up influencing the LDP's approach in fielding relatively few candidates, and members of the party believed that if they disregarded the polls and fielded more candidates, they could have won a larger share of the seats in this election. Meanwhile, the Japan Socialist Party also saw a loss in seats (partly due to vote splitting caused by former member Saburō Eda's SCL splinter party siphoning away votes from the JSP. The Japanese Communist Party also saw a decline in fortunes, with Kōmeitō and the Democratic Socialist Party showing the most promise among well-established opposition parties.

Results

By constituency

References

Japan
House of Councillors (Japan) elections
House of Councillors election
Japanese House of Councillors election
Election and referendum articles with incomplete results